Mark Whitaker is a San Francisco Bay Area-based music producer who was the manager of Exodus and sound engineer of Metallica in the 1980s. Whitaker acted as a producer on Exodus’ debut album Bonded by Blood (1985) and partly on their second effort Pleasures of the Flesh (1987). He managed former Exodus guitarist Kirk Hammett to Metallica in 1983. Whitaker was one of the key persons in the emerging Bay Area thrash metal scene in the 1980s.

External links 
Exodus biography on MusicMight.com
Metallica biography on MusicMight.com

American record producers
Place of birth missing (living people)
Year of birth missing (living people)
Living people
People from the San Francisco Bay Area